Hippotion gracilis is a moth of the  family Sphingidae. It is known from most of sub-Saharan Africa.

The wingspan is 64.6–71.1 mm for males and 66.9–71.1 mm for females. It is very similar to Hippotion eson, but in general smaller, paler and with a less contrasting forewing upperside pattern. The forewing upperside is also very similar to Hippotion eson, but the first and second postmedian lines are thinner and paler and not fused. On average, the discal spot is smaller.

References

Hippotion
Lepidoptera of Cameroon
Lepidoptera of the Democratic Republic of the Congo
Lepidoptera of Malawi
Moths of Réunion
Moths of Sub-Saharan Africa
Moths described in 1875